George Turner (3 June 1915 – 21 August 1965) was a Canadian cyclist. He competed in the three events at the 1936 Summer Olympics.

References

External links
 

1915 births
1965 deaths
Canadian male cyclists
Olympic cyclists of Canada
Cyclists at the 1936 Summer Olympics
Place of birth missing